Christ School in Bangalore, India is an educational institution run by the Catholic Minority Community with all the rights and privileges granted by the Constitution of India and recognized but un-aided by the Department of Education of Karnataka State. It is run by the fathers of the Congregation of the Carmelites of Mary Immaculate (CMI) in the Catholic Church through a Registered Body - "Christian Educational Society of Bangalore".

The school, with a roll of 3267, is reputed to be one of the largest schools in India. It is associated with Christ University, another CMI institution in Bangalore. The school attracts some of the best faculty given the rich academic and co-curricular environment that prevails in the institution.

The school imparts education to students from Kindergarten to Std X in English medium, across the ICSE, CBSE and the State Boards. It is open to all irrespective of religion, caste or community. 

In honor of the founding father of the CMIs who run the school, the school has a week-long celebration called The Chavara Cultural Festival and Inter School Tournament, to which all the schools in the city are invited.

The school conducts flagship events such as the Annual Science Exhibition and provides state-of-the-art facilities in their laboratories (including their Robotics lab). In addition, the students of Christ School regularly participate in multiple Olympiad contests, both at the State and at the National level.

Moral and religious instructions are also part and parcel of the curriculum. There is an Ecumenical Prayer Room for the children of all religions to meet and pray. Once in a month there is general prayer service for all non-Catholics (who form the majority) and a Catholic mass for the others. 

The school owns a fleet of buses for transporting students from different parts of Bangalore.

Programs 
The school has numerous events throughout. In 2016, for commemorating the Hiroshima and Nagasaki Bombing, Japanese people were invited to a Skype call. There is an Annual Day held every year usually in February.

Management 
The school is presently being run by Fr. Nilson until 2024. The principals were: 

*Note: The year of end of service is calculated per academic year that is June-March.

External links

 

Carmelite educational institutions
Catholic secondary schools in India
Christian schools in Karnataka
Primary schools in Karnataka
High schools and secondary schools in Bangalore